Paritchaikku Neramaachu is a 1982 Indian Tamil-language drama film, directed by Muktha Srinivasan and produced by Muktha Ramaswamy. The film stars Sivaji Ganesan, Sujatha, Thengai Srinivasan and Y. G. Mahendran. It is based on Mahendran's play of the same name. The film was released on 14 November 1982.

Plot 

Sivaji has a dimwit son. The son is considered an idiot on account of his inability to clear exams and get a job. He is in love with his tenant's daughter who also reciprocates. Sivaji goes to the extent of buying question papers ahead of time leaving his principles and self-respect in attempt to get his son through but fails. While leaving to appear for an exam, in the hurry, he dies in a bus accident.

Sivaji's wife becomes mentally ill due to it. Sivaji then runs into his son's look alike who is a rowdy. He asks him to play his son to cure his wife. The look alike agrees as he is temporarily on the run from the cops. Eventually he becomes a good guy seeing Sivaji's love. Sivaji and his wife adopt as well as accept him as their own son. He wants to fulfill his father's dream of clearing the exam and getting a job but then the adopted son, in a twist of fate, also dies in a similar bus accident.

Cast 

Sivaji Ganesan
Sujatha
Thengai Srinivasan
Y. G. Mahendran
Vennira Aadai Moorthy
V. Gopalakrishnan
Radha Ravi
Delhi Ganesh
Y. G. Parthasarathy
Neelu
Kathadi Ramamurthy
Usilai Mani
Oru Viral Krishna Rao
Typist Gopu
G. Srinivasan
Loose Mohan
Manorama
Poornima Jayaram
Silk Smitha
S. N. Parvathy

Production 
Y. G. Mahendran wrote and staged the play Paritchaikku Neramaachu in 1978. After watching the play, Muktha Srinivasan expressed interest in a film adaptation which he eventually directed.

Soundtrack 
The music was composed by M. S. Viswanathan, with lyrics by Vaali.

Reception 
Kalki negatively reviewed the film.

Dropped remake 
In 2012, Mahendran confirmed that a remake of Paritchaikku Neramaachu starring Santhanam was in development. The project was later dropped.

References

External links 
 

1980s Tamil-language films
1982 drama films
1982 films
Films directed by Muktha Srinivasan
Films scored by M. S. Viswanathan
Indian drama films
Indian films based on plays